Lorraine is a western suburb of Port Elizabeth, Eastern Cape in South Africa.

Location 
Lorraine is located 13 km west of Port Elizabeth's city centre and borders the suburbs of Beverly Grove, Weybridge Park and Woodlands to the north, Goldwater to the north-east, Fairview to the east, Theescombe to the south and Kamma Park to the west.

Lorraine is located a few kilometres south of the N2 highway and is connected to the N2 via the M7 Bramlin Street and M12 Kragga Kamma Road. The N2 highway connects to Humansdorp and Cape Town to the west and Makhanda to the east.

Facilities 
Lorraine has no police station however it falls under the jurisdiction of the Walmer Police Station just 10 km west of Lorraine.

Lorraine also has no hospitals, but the nearest hospitals is the Nurture Aurora Hospital in Walmer Downs for people with disabilities and the Netcare Greenacres Hospital. Despite not having a hospital Lorraine does however include a frail care centre. 

Lorraine has two shopping centre, Kamma Crossing and The Gardens Shopping Centre. Nearby and larger shopping centers are Baywest Mall and Greenacres Shopping Centre.

Education 
Schools in Lorraine include Lorraine Primary School and the Amadeus Independent School. Nearby schools include Kabega Christian Independent School, Sunridge Primary School, St Joseph's RC School, Curro Westbrook, Westering High School and Westering Primary School amongst others.

Referencing 

Port Elizabeth